Methodist Episcopal Church of Port Hadlock (Barrett House) is a historic Methodist church, now a private home, at Randolph and Matheson Streets in Hadlock, Washington. Built in 1903, the church was the first permanent Methodist church in Hadlock. The congregation shared a traveling minister with the Methodist church in Chimacum. In the 1950s, the two congregations merged to form a new church; the Hadlock church's old bell and pews were moved to the new church, and the old building became a private residence.

The church was added to the National Register of Historic Places in 1983.

References

Methodist churches in Washington (state)
Churches on the National Register of Historic Places in Washington (state)
Churches completed in 1903
Buildings and structures in Jefferson County, Washington
National Register of Historic Places in Jefferson County, Washington